The 2012 elections for the Pennsylvania State Senate were held on November 6, 2012, with all odd-numbered districts being contested. The primary elections were held on April 24, 2012. The term of office for those elected in 2012 began when the Senate convened in January 2013. Pennsylvania State Senators are elected to four-year terms, with 25 of the 50 seats contested every two years.

Make-up of the Senate following the 2012 elections

General election

Source: Pennsylvania Department of State

References

2012 Pennsylvania elections
Pennsylvania State Senate elections
Pennsylvania Senate